George Gabriel (born April 22, 1971) is an American multi-instrumentalist and composer. He has composed and scored music for television and film for 23 years.

He began television composing in 1996 when he started working with the news music company Gari Communications. In 1999 he joined with composers Cory Lerios and John D'Andrea to score Baywatch Hawaii. Gabriel scored Lean Forward Media's direct-DVD release Choose Your Own Adventure. Gabriel wrote the theme of Disney's Kim Possible, "Call Me, Beep Me". It was the first Disney-produced song to reach #1 on Disney Radio, staying there for 14 weeks.

TV music
The following music was created or co-created by George Gabriel.

Pablo Cruise
After a long working relationship with the rock band Pablo Cruise's founding member Cory Lerios, Gabriel and Lerios began playing with founding member and drummer Steve Price in the fall of 2004. In 2004 Lerios and Price rejoined Pablo Cruise and Gabriel replaced original member Bud Cockrell on the bass. In Pablo Cruise, Gabriel played alongside the Little River Band, Starship, The Beach Boys, The Doobie Brothers and Journey. In November 2009. Gabriel and Pablo Cruise parted company.

Solo career
In 2009, Gabriel released his first solo album, titled Everyday Miracles, available on iTunes and other digital music delivery sites. Everyday Miracles is about life, love, and faith. The inspiration of this album comes from Gabriel's walk in faith and how his trials and celebrations have formed who he is today. He played the drums, bass, guitar, and piano in addition to providing vocals. Every aspect of this recording is written, engineered, played, and produced by Gabriel in his Southern California studio. The song "Here I Am" is featured in the film Live To Forgive, which Gabriel also scored.

Gabriel teaches many young talented students in the field of audio engineering. He was nominated and won the award for best teacher with the Moorpark College CEC program.

Discography
Everyday Miracles

References

Living people
1971 births
American male songwriters
American rock bass guitarists
American jazz bass guitarists
Place of birth missing (living people)
American television composers
American film score composers
American rock singers
American multi-instrumentalists
American male bass guitarists
Pablo Cruise members
21st-century American singers
21st-century American bass guitarists
American male film score composers
21st-century American male singers
American male jazz musicians